Dimpy Ganguli (formerly Dimpy Mahajan) is an Indian model and television personality.

Early life 
Her real name is Soumoshree Ganguli, Dimpy was her nickname. Her father's name is Saibal Ganguly and her mother's name is Sushmita Ganguli. Dimpy graduated with an honors degree in English literature from the renowned Scottish Church College in 2009.

Personal life 
In 2010, Ganguli married Rahul Mahajan, son of BJP leader Pramod Mahajan, on Imagine TV's swayamvar reality show, Rahul Dulhaniya Le Jayenge.  Ganguli filed for divorce on the grounds of domestic violence and physical abuse. The couple finally divorced in February 2015.

In November 2015, Ganguli married Dubai-based businessman, Rohit Roy. Their daughter Reanna was born on 20 June 2016.
In 2020, Ganguly gave birth to a son Aryaan.

Career 
She was one of the contestants of Gladrags Mega Model Manhunt 2009, a beauty contest from India. She was also the second runners up in Sananda Tilottama in 2007.

In 2014, she participated in the television reality shows Bigg Boss 8 and its spin-off Bigg Boss Halla Bol. She was evicted from the show on 31 January 2015.

Television

References

Living people
Female models from Kolkata
1985 births
Scottish Church College alumni
University of Calcutta alumni
Bigg Boss (Hindi TV series) contestants